Edmund Hansen may refer to:

 Edmund H. Hansen (1894–1962), American sound engineer
 Edmund Hansen (cyclist) (1900–1995), Danish Olympic cyclist